Athens Concert is a live album by jazz saxophonist Charles Lloyd and the Greek singer Maria Farantouri. Recorded in 2010 by the Charles Lloyd Quartet with Maria Farantouri and released on the ECM label.

Reception
The Allmusic review by Thom Jurek awarded the album  stars and states "The Athens Concert is truly inspirational and quite a watermark in a career full of them for Lloyd".

Track listing
All compositions by Charles Lloyd except as indicated
Disc One:
 "Kratissa Ti Zoi Mou" (Mikis Theodorakis) - 5:59 
 "Dream Weaver" - 8:10 
 "Blow Wind" - 5:34 
 "Requiem" (Agathi Dimitrouka, Lloyd) - 5:57 
 "Greek Suite Part 1: Hymnos Stin Ayia Triada" - (Traditional) - 4:03 
 "Greek Suite Part 1: Epano Sto Xero Homa" (Theodorakis) - 2:52 
 "Greek Suite Part 1: Messa Stous Paradissious Kipous" (Theodorakis) - 4:49 
 "Taxidi Sta Kythera" (Eleni Karaindrou) - 4:35 
Disc Two:
 "Prayer" - 7:58 
 "Greek Suite Part 2: Vlefaro Mou" (Nikos Kypourgos, Lina Nikolakopoulou) - 3:32 
 "Greek Suite Part 2: Margaritarenia" (Traditional) - 1:29 
 "Greek Suite Part 2: Thalassaki Mou" (Traditional) - 2:57 
 "Greek Suite Part 3: Epirotiko Meroloi" (Traditional) - 6:28 
 "Greek Suite Part 3: Kægomæ Kæ Sigoliono"  (Traditional) - 5:00 
 "Greek Suite Part 3: Mori Kontoula Lemonia" (Traditional) - 2:40 
 "Greek Suite Part 3: AlismonoKæ Hæromæ" (Traditional) - 3:06 
 "Greek Suite Part 3: Tou Hel'To Kastron" (Traditional) - 4:28 
 "Yanni Mou" (Traditional) - 7:27 
Recorded at the Herod Atticus Odeon in Athens, Greece in June 2010

Personnel
Charles Lloyd - tenor saxophone, alto flute, tarogato
Maria Farantouri - voice
Jason Moran - piano
Reuben Rogers - bass
Eric Harland - drums 
Socratis Sinopoulos - lyra
Takis Farazis - piano

References

2011 live albums
ECM Records live albums
Albums produced by Manfred Eicher
Charles Lloyd (jazz musician) live albums